Filmworks IV: S/M + More features film scores by John Zorn. The album was released in Japan on Eva Records in 1996 and on Zorn's own label, Tzadik Records, in 1997.  It features the music that Zorn wrote and recorded for Maria Beatty's The Elegant Spanking, Beatty and M.M. Serra's A Lot of Fun for the Evil One, "Credits Included" written for the film of the same name directed by Jalal Toufic and "Maogai," written for a piano scene in a film by Hiroki Ryuichi.

Reception
The Allmusic review by Stacia Proefrock awarded the album 3 stars noting that "While this album may not contain the precise and complex structures of Zorn's other experimental work, one gets the sense that he gave himself free rein to play a little, and came up with something new".

Track listing
All compositions by John Zorn
 "Pueblo" - 9:04
 "Elegant Spanking" (Suite) - 14:22
 "Credits Included" (A Video in Red & Green) a. Politics, b. Asylum - 9:38
 "Maogai" (Suite & Variations) - 6:19
 "A Lot of Fun for the Evil One" - 17:48
(1-3) recorded at Shelley Palmer Studio, New York City
(4) recorded at Romanisches Cafe, Tokyo
(5) recorded at Harmonic Ranch, New York City

Personnel

Marc Ribot (1) - guitar
Robert Quine (1) - guitar
Anthony Coleman (1) - organ
Chris Wood (1) - bass
Cyro Baptista (1) - percussion
Joey Baron (1) - drums
Carol Emanuel (2) - harp
Jill Jaffee (2) - viola
Erik Friedlander (2) - cello
Jim Pugliese (2) - vibes, percussion
Kuroda Kyoko (4) - piano
John Zorn (3,5) - sound design, keyboards

References

Tzadik Records soundtracks
Albums produced by John Zorn
John Zorn soundtracks
1995 soundtrack albums
Film soundtracks